The 2012 Gabala Cup is an international football tournament for U-15 teams held in Azerbaijan.

Participants
 Villarreal
 Levante
 Galatasaray
 Feyenoord
 Brondby
 Qarabağ
 Gabala

Format
The eight invited teams were split into two groups that played a round-robin tournament. On completion of this, the fourth placed teams in each group would play each other to determine seventh and eighth place, the third placed teams in each group would play each other to decide fifth and sixth place, the second placed teams in each group would play to determine third and fourth place and the winners of each group would compete for first and second place overall.

Points awarded in the group stage followed the standard formula of three points for a win, one point for a draw and zero points for a loss.

Group A

Group B

References

1st GABALA CUP - 2012

International club association football competitions hosted by Azerbaijan
Gaba